The 5th International Emmy Kids Awards ceremony, presented by the International Academy of Television Arts and Sciences (IATAS), took place on April 4, 2017 in Cannes, France. The nominations were announced on October 17, 2016. They are the only Emmys presented outside the U.S.

Ceremony information
Nominations for the 5th International Emmy Kids Awards were announced on October 17, 2016 by the International Academy of Television Arts and Sciences (IATAS) during a press conference at MIPCOM in Cannes, France. The winners were announced on April 4, 2017 at the Martinez Hotel, in Cannes during MIPTV.  The winners spanned series from Australia, Denmark, the Netherlands and the United Kingdom.

Winners

References

External links 
 International Academy of Television Arts and Sciences website

International Emmy Kids Awards ceremonies
International Emmy Kids Awards
International Emmy Kids Awards
International Emmy Kids Awards
International Emmy Kids Awards